Alatopetra is a village and a community of the Grevena municipality. The village was also known as Tuz (Turkish word for "salt") until the formal renaming act of 1927. Before the 2011 local government reform it was a part of the municipality of Theodoros Ziakas, of which it was a municipal district. The 2011 census recorded 76 residents in the village. The community of Alatopetra covers an area of 8.272 km2.

See also
 List of settlements in the Grevena regional unit

References

Populated places in Grevena (regional unit)